Michael Coleman (born 1871) was an Irish Gaelic footballer who played for the Cork senior team.

Coleman made his first appearance for the team during the 1890 championship and was a regular member of the starting fifteen until the end of the 1894 championship. During that time he won one All-Ireland medal and two Munster medals.

At club level Moore was a one-time county championship medalist with Midleton.

References

1871 births
Midleton Gaelic footballers
Cork inter-county Gaelic footballers
Winners of one All-Ireland medal (Gaelic football)
Year of death missing